Matheus Avelino Da Silva (born 29 December 2000) is a Brazilian footballer who currently plays for Al Arabi.

Career statistics

Club

Notes

References

External links

2000 births
Living people
Brazilian footballers
Brazilian expatriate footballers
Association football midfielders
UAE Pro League players
UAE First Division League players
Nacional Atlético Clube (SP) players
Al-Wasl F.C. players
Al-Arabi SC (UAE) players
Dibba Al-Hisn Sports Club players
Expatriate footballers in the United Arab Emirates
Brazilian expatriate sportspeople in the United Arab Emirates